The 55th district of the Texas House of Representatives contains roughly half of the population of Bell County, including most of the cities of Temple and Belton, and parts of Killeen. The current Representative is Hugh Shine, who was first elected in 2016.

References 

55